Govier is a surname. Notable people with the surname include:

James Henry Govier (1910–1974), British painter and etcher
Katherine Govier (born 1948), Canadian novelist and essayist
Sheldon Govier (1876-1951), American soccer player
Steve Govier  (born 1952) English football player
Trudy Govier (born 1944), Canadian philosopher